Massimo Mongai (3 November 1950 – 1 November 2016) was an Italian author of science fiction.

Biography
Born in Rome, by the age of 12 Massimo Mongai was a dedicated reader of science fiction. He graduated in law. According to the biography printed in many of his books, his influences include the science-fiction writers Isaac Asimov, A. E. van Vogt, Poul Anderson and Philip José Farmer and the crime writers Rex Stout and Andrea Camilleri.

Works
In 1997, he wrote Memorie di un cuoco d'astronave. This blend of space saga and cooking manual won Italy's Urania Award.

His other books include Il gioco degli immortali, Tette e pistole, Memorie di un cuoco di un bordello spaziale, Cronache non ufficiali di due spie italiane, Il Fascio sulle stelle di Benito Mussolini and Alienati, a novel about an inter-planetary convention of psychoanalysts. He also worked on the Italian magazine Il Falcone Maltese, dedicated to crime fiction, known in Italy as giallo.

References

External links
 Massimo Mongai (Interview in English)

1950 births
2016 deaths
Writers from Rome
Italian science fiction writers
20th-century Italian novelists
20th-century Italian male writers
21st-century Italian novelists
Italian male novelists
21st-century Italian male writers